The Georgia Research Alliance is an Atlanta, Georgia-based nonprofit organization that coordinates research efforts between Georgia's public and private sectors. While GRA receives a state appropriation for investment in university-based research opportunities, its operations are funded through foundation and industry contributions. In its first 19 years, GRA leveraged $525 million in state funding into $2.6 billion of additional federal and private investment. The university partners include the following institutions:

University of Georgia
Augusta University
Emory University
Clark Atlanta University
Georgia Institute of Technology
Georgia State University
Mercer University
Morehouse School of Medicine

See also
University System of Georgia

References

External links
 Official site
 Georgia Research Alliance at the New Georgia Encyclopedia

Organizations based in Atlanta